Pierre Nepveu  (born 16 September 1946 in Montreal, Quebec) is a  French Canadian poet, novelist and essayist. As a scholar, he specializes in modern Quebec poetry, in particular the work of Gaston Miron.  He taught at the French Studies Department of Université de Montréal from 1979 until his retirement in 2009.

Awards and recognition
 1979: non-fiction finalist, Governor General's Awards, Les mots à l'écoute
 1986: fiction finalist, Governor General's Awards, L'hiver de Mira Christophe
 1997: poetry winner, Governor General's Awards, Romans-fleuves
 1998: nonfiction winner, Governor General's Awards, Intérieurs du Nouveau Monde : Essais sur les littératures du Québec et des Amériques
 2003: poetry winner, Governor General's Awards, Lignes aériennes
 2005: winner, Prix Athanase-David
 2011: Member of the Order of Canada
 2018: Officer of the National Order of Quebec

Bibliography
1977: Épisodes (L'Hexagone)
1979: Les mots à l'écoute: poésie et silence chez Fernand Ouellette, Gaston Miron et Paul-Marie Lapointe (Presses de l'Université Laval) 
1980–1981: with Laurent Mailhot, La Poésie québécoise, des origines à nos jours, anthology (Presses de l'Université du Québec) 
1996: reissue (Typo) 
1986: L'hiver de Mira Christophe, novel (Boréal) 
1986: co-compiler with Laurent Mailhot, La Poésie québécoise: des origines à nos jours (Hexagone) 
1992: Des mondes peu habités, novel (Boréal) 
1997: English translation by Judith Weisz Woodsworth, Still lives  (Nuage Editions) 
1992: with Gilles Marcotte, Montréal imaginaire: ville et littérature (Fides) 
1997: Romans-fleuves (Éditions du Noroît) 
1998: English translation by Donald Winkler, Romans-fleuves (Exile Editions) 
1998: Intérieurs du Nouveau Monde: essais sur les littératures du Québec et des Amériques (Boreal) 
1999: L'écologie du réel: mort et naissance de la littérature québécoise contemporaine (Boréal) 
2002: Lignes aériennes (Éditions du Noroît) 
2004: English translation by Judith Cowan, Mirabel (Signal Editions) 
2004: editor with Marie-Andrée Beaudet, Un long chemin: proses, 1953-1996, compilation of works by Gaston Miron (L'Hexagone)

References

External links

 Véhicule Press: Mirabel, accessed 13 July 2006
 Collections Canada: 1997 Governor General's Award Winner: Pierre Nepveu, accessed 13 July 2006
  Pierre Nepveu, accessed 13 July 2006
 Critical bibliography (Auteurs.contemporain.info) 

1946 births
Living people
Canadian literary critics
Canadian male novelists
Writers from Montreal
Academic staff of the Université de Montréal
Governor General's Award-winning poets
Governor General's Award-winning non-fiction writers
Canadian poets in French
Members of the Order of Canada
Prix Athanase-David winners
20th-century Canadian novelists
20th-century Canadian poets
Canadian male poets
21st-century Canadian novelists
21st-century Canadian poets
Canadian novelists in French
20th-century Canadian male writers
21st-century Canadian male writers
Canadian male non-fiction writers